The 22105/22106 Indrayani Superfast Express is a superfast express train belonging to Indian Railways that runs between Mumbai CSMT and Pune Junction in India.

It is a daily service and is named after the river Indrayani flowing near Pune.

The train earlier numbered as 1021 while running from Mumbai to Pune and 1022 from Pune to Mumbai, has now been upgraded to superfast and renumbered as 22105 (Mumbai CSMT - Pune Junction) and 22106 (Pune Junction - Mumbai CSMT).

The train had white and royal blue livery with red bands. On 2 February 2020 it was upgraded to LHB coaches.

Coaches

The Indrayani Express presently has two AC Chair Cars, eight General Second Class, two General Second Class coaches reserved for pass holders, and five General Unreserved coaches. As is customary with Indian Railways, coaches are added/removed as per the demand.

This train shares its rake with the Pune Solapur Intercity Express, and operational control is with Central Railways.

Service

The Indrayani Express was introduced on 27 April 1988 and is one of six dedicated Intercity Chair Car trains between Mumbai CSMT and Pune Junction.  The other five trains are 12127/28 Mumbai Pune Intercity Express, 11007/08 Deccan Express, 11009/10 Sinhagad Express, 12125/26 Pragati Express and 12123/24 Deccan Queen.

It covers the distance of 192 kilometres in 3 hours 28 mins as 22105 Indrayani Express (55.38 km/hr) and 3 hours 20 mins as 22106 Indrayani Express (57.60 km/hr).

Traction

Although the route is electrified, it is currently hauled by Kalyan or Pune based WDM 3D/WDM 3A/WDG 3A diesel locomotive and has been occasionally hauled by WDP-4 locomotive as well. This is to save time in locomotive change, due to the rake sharing with Pune Solapur Intercity Express, as the route after Daund Junction is not yet electrified and is currently undergoing doubling and electrification.

When the train was introduced back in 1988, it was hauled by WCM 1/2/5 DC locomotives till the mid 1990s as the section between Mumbai CSMT and Pune was under 1500 V DC traction. From the mid 1990s, it was hauled by WCAM 2/2P or WCAM 3 dual traction locomotives of the Kalyan shed till November 2009, when the rake sharing was initiated.

At Karjat, it gets two or three WAG-5, WAG-7, WCAM-2 or WCAM 3 bankers of Kalyan shed to push the train on the ghat section between Karjat railway station and Lonavala railway station, where the gradient is of 1 in 40.

During the COVID-19 pandemic, all passenger trains of Indian Railways were suspended for operating from 24 March 2020 due to lockdown. Indrayani Express resumed its operations from 9 October 2020. However, this time train used to be hauled by WAP-7 Electric Locomotive since its rake sharing train Pune-Solapur Intercity Express was not permitted to resume operation.

Time Table

The Indrayani Express is the first of six dedicated trains to leave Mumbai CSMT for Pune Junction and is the last train to return.

22105 Indrayani Express leaves Mumbai CSMT every day at 05:40 hrs IST and reaches Pune Junction at 09:08 hrs IST.

On return, the 22106 Indrayani Express leaves Pune Junction every day at 18:35 hrs IST and reaches Mumbai CSMT at 21:55 hrs IST.

Runaway train incident

On the night of 1 December 1994, the Indrayani Express lost braking power after a locomotive fire near Thakurwadi cabin on the steep Bhore Ghat section between Karjat and Lonavla. The runaway train travelled at over a 100kmph on the downhill section till it rolled to a stop in the plains. The exact reasons behind the incident are still unknown.

References

External links
 Dedicated Intercity trains of India

See also
 Mumbai–Pune Passenger
 Sister trains Mumbai-Pune:

 Pune-Solapur Intercity (Indrayani) Express

Transport in Pune
Transport in Mumbai
Mumbai–Pune trains
Express trains in India
Rail transport in Maharashtra
Named passenger trains of India